Three vessels of the British Royal Navy have borne the name Morne Fortunee for Morne Fortuné:

  was possibly originally the Bermudian schooner Glory launched in 1801, but captured as the French privateer Morne Fortunée in 1803. She was wrecked in 1804.
  was the French privateer Regulus that HMS Princess Charlotte captured in 1804. Morne Fortunee was commissioned in 1806 and capsized in 1809.
  was the French privateer Joséphine that  captured in 1808 and that was broken up in 1813 at Antigua.

Royal Navy ship names